NGC 397 is a lenticular galaxy located in the constellation Pisces. It was discovered on December 6, 1866 by Robert Ball. It was described by Dreyer as "extremely faint, small, round, very faint star to west."

References

External links
 

0397
18661206
Pisces (constellation)
Lenticular galaxies
004051